Dunmor is an unincorporated community and census-designated place (CDP) in Muhlenberg and Logan counties, Kentucky, United States. As of the 2010 census it had a population of 317.

History
A post office was established in the community in 1884. The name Dunmor may have come from either colonial politician Lord Dunmore, or the local Dunn family.

Geography
Dunmor is located in southern Muhlenberg County, with a portion extending south into Logan County. U.S. Route 431 passes through the community, leading north  to Central City and south the same distance to Russellville.

Demographics

Climate
The climate in this area is characterized by hot, humid summers and generally mild to cool winters. According to the Köppen Climate Classification system, Dunmor has a humid subtropical climate, abbreviated "Cfa" on climate maps.

References

Census-designated places in Muhlenberg County, Kentucky
Census-designated places in Logan County, Kentucky
Census-designated places in Kentucky